Shinsenen (神泉苑) is a Shingon Japanese Buddhist temple located south of Nijō Castle in the approximate center of the modern city of Kyoto, Honshu, Japan. It was founded by Kūkai in 824 and predominantly consists of a large water garden centering about a pond. It is said to be the oldest existing garden in Kyoto.

History 
First built in the year 794, the site was originally connected to the Heian Palace of that time and was used as a private garden for the Emperor. According to the records, the site originally extended approximately 400 meters from north to south and about 200 meters from east to west (500 meters and 240 meters according to different sources).

In 863 a plague extended throughout the city and a sacred ritual to appease the angry spirits was held. Later, a total of 66 pikes (representing the regions of Japan of that time) were erected on the south end of the Shinsenen, Mikoshi from the Gion-jinja (today's Yasaka Shrine) were brought in and a ritual was conducted. Over the years this became a local festival and the pikes were mounted on decorated carts, which is said to be the origin of the modern day Gion Matsuri.

In 1603 when Tokugawa Ieyasu built the Nijō Castle, a large portion of the garden's land was absorbed by the castle grounds, reducing its size. After 1607 the garden was reconstructed and later became a Buddhist temple of the Shingon school.

See also
Tō-ji, a major and contemporary Shingon temple in Kyoto

External links
Official website

References

Buddhist temples in Kyoto
Shingon Buddhism
Tōji Shingon temples
Gardens in Kyoto Prefecture
Pagodas in Japan
Historic Sites of Japan
8th-century establishments in Japan
Religious buildings and structures completed in 794